Steynsburg Hospital is a Provincial government funded hospital for the Joe Gqabi District Municipality area in Steynsburg, Eastern Cape in South Africa.

The hospital departments include Emergency department, Maternity ward, Out Patients Department, Surgical Services, Medical Services, Pharmacy, Anti-Retroviral (ARV) treatment for HIV/AIDS, Oral Health Care Provides, Physiotherapy, Laundry Services, Kitchen Services and Mortuary.

References 
 Eastern Cape Department of Health website

Hospitals in the Eastern Cape
Joe Gqabi District Municipality